Fares is the plural of fare, a fee paid by a passenger allowing them to take a mode of transportation. It may also refer to:

Places
Fares (village), a village in Greece
Aïn Fares (disambiguation), several places in Algeria
Fares-Maathodaa, an island in the Maldives

People
 Fares (name)

See also
Faires (disambiguation)
Fairs (disambiguation)
Fare (disambiguation)
Faris (disambiguation)